Jürgen Fuchs may refer to:

Jürgen  Fuchs (motorcyclist), German motorcyclist
Jürgen Fuchs (writer), East German writer and dissident